British rapper Giggs has released four studio albums, eighteen mixtapes, nine solo singles (not including any as a featured artist) and twenty-seven music videos. A majority of his releases have been independently released through SN1 Records, alongside several releases through XL Recordings and Takeover Entertainment.

In August 2008, Giggs released his debut album Walk in da Park independently. The album charted at number 143 on the UK Albums Chart, number 9 on the UK Independent Chart and number 13 on the UK R&B Chart. No singles were released from the album. Two years later, Giggs' second album Let Em Ave It became his first top 40 entry, charting at number 35 on the UK Albums Chart. It spawned four singles – "Slow Songs", "Don't Go There", "Look What the Cat Dragged In" and "Hustle On". Two of the four singles peaked in the top 100. In October 2013, Giggs' third studio album was released, When Will It Stop?. The album peaked at number 21 on the UK Albums Chart, becoming Giggs' highest-charting release at the time.

In August 2016, Giggs released his fourth studio album, Landlord, becoming his most successful release to date. It entered and peaked at number 2 on the UK Albums Chart. In 2017, the commercial mixtape Wamp 2 Dem also peaked at number 2 on the UK Albums Chart. The latter project spawned the single "Linguo" featuring Donae'o, Giggs' most successful solo single, peaking at number 28 on the UK Singles Chart. In the same year, Giggs earned his first top 40 entries through his guest appearances on the songs "No Long Talk" and "KMT" by Canadian rapper Drake from his commercial project More Life (2017) – peaking at number 9 and number 7 on the UK Singles Chart respectively.

Studio albums

Commercial mixtapes

Mixtapes
 Bloody Raw (2005)
 SN1 – The Beginning (with Gunna Dee & Joe Grind) (2006)
 Best of Giggs (The Real Meaning) (2006)
 Hollow Grind (with Joe Grind) (2006)
 Hollowman Meets Blade (with Blade Brown) (2007)
 Ard Bodied (with Dubz) (2007)
 Best of Giggs 2 (2008)
 Who Said That? (2009)
 Another Quick One (2009)
 Best of Giggs 3 (2010)
 Take Your Hats Off (hosted by DJ Whoo Kid) (2011)
 Every Angle Friday (2011)
 The Final Straw (2011) 
 Best of Giggs 4 (2013)
 STR8 Murkin (2014)
 The SN1 Folder (2015)
 Best of Giggs 5 (2018)

Singles

As lead artist

As featured artist

Other charted and certified songs

Guest appearances

Music videos

References

Hip hop discographies